OGLE-2007-BLG-368Lb is an extrasolar planet located approximately 19,230 light-years away in the constellation of Scorpius, orbiting the star OGLE-2007-BLG-368L. This planet was detected on December 8, 2009 by the gravitational microlensing by Sumi. It has mass 6.94% of Jupiter (i.e. 22 times that of Earth) and is located 3.3 AU from the star when observed. Based on those properties it would classify as a Cold Neptune. It is the second Cold Neptune to be observed, the first being OGLE-2005-BLG-169Lb. This planet is most likely be similar to Uranus and Neptune in the Solar System in terms of atmospheric and internal properties.

References

Scorpius (constellation)
Giant planets
Exoplanets detected by microlensing
Exoplanets discovered in 2009